WGP may refer to:
 White gold plating:
 White gold (when plated onto another metal) 
 Colloquially, rhodium plating of gold 
 Wales Green Party, UK political party
 WGP Kickboxing, a Brazilian kickboxing promotion
 Workshop on Generic Programming, computer science conference
 Umbu Mehang Kunda Airport, Indonesia (IATA code: WGP)